Aurana vinaceella is a species of snout moth in the genus Aurana. It was described by Hiroshi Inoue in 1963 and is known from Japan.

References

Moths described in 1963
Phycitini
Moths of Japan